The 1985–86 Toto Cup Leumit was the 2nd season of the third most important football tournament in Israel since its introduction. 

It was held in two stages. First, the 16 Liga Leumit teams were divided into four groups. The group winners advanced to the semi-finals, which, as was the final, were held as one-legged matches. The first stage of the competition was played between 5 October 1985 and 9 November 1985, while the national team was competing in the 1986 World Cup qualification.

The competition was won by Hapoel Petah Tikva, who had beaten Hapoel Be'er Sheva 2–1 in the final.

Group stage
The matches were played from 5 October to 9 November 1985.

Group A

Group B

Group C

Group D

Elimination rounds

Semifinals

Final

See also
 1985–86 Toto Cup Artzit

External links
 Toto Cup Leumit 1985/86  

Leumit
Toto Cup Leumit
Toto Cup Leumit